The Khasi and Jaintia Hills are a mountainous region that was mainly part of Assam and Meghalaya. This area is now part of the present Indian constitutive state of Meghalaya (formerly part of Assam), which includes the present districts of East Jaintia Hills district, headquarter Khliehriat, West Jaintia Hills district, headquarter Jowai, East Khasi Hills district, headquarter Shillong, and West Khasi Hills district, headquarter Nongstoin.

Jaintia Hills 

The Jaintia Hills are located further to the east from the Khasi Hills.
The twelve Chiefs of the elaka (tribal province) of the Pnars, a  Khasi Sub-tribe are styled Dolloi, and the land is called after them in Khasi: KA RI KHADAR DOLLOI (‘Land of 12 Tribal Chiefs‘) - they are in Nartiang itself (see the Raja, uniquely also styled, as premier Chief: U Kongsong), and in Amwi, Jowai, Lakadong, Mynso, Nongbah, Nongjngi, Nongphyllut, Nongtalang, Raliang, Shangpung, Sutnga (see below; the Syiems).

Above them is the only true princely ruler of the area, the Raja of the Jaintia Kingdom. His winter capital, Jaintiapur is now in Bangladesh, while his summer residence shifted from Sutnga (where the family started as Syiems) to Nartiang; also a palace in the commercial center Borghat in Meghalaya.

The Jaintia Hills used to be a part of the Jaintia Hills District. The district has been bifurcated into two separate districts, namely, East Jaintia Hills and West Jaintia Hills on 31 July 2012.

Khasi Hills 

The Khasi Hills are located east of the Garo Hills.
The other Khasi tribes did not have princes but their twenty petty states (hima), and sometimes even smaller tribal divisions, are led by one or two Chiefs -selected in various ways- usually styled Siem, Syiem.

The names of these chieftainships are : Bhowal, Cherra (or Sohra; capital Cherrapunji), Dwara (capital Hat Dwara), Jirang, Khyri(e)m (capital Cherrapunjee, under a Radja), Langrin, Langïong, Maharam, Malai Sohmat, Marriw, Mawdon, Mawiang, Mawlong, Mawphlang, Mylliem (including Shillong city, the colonial capital of all Tribal Assam), Nobosohphoh, Nonglwai, Nongkhlaw, Nongspung, Nongstoiñ, Pamsanngut, Rambrai, Shella, Sohïong. or Sardar ...

References

External links 
 Map of the Khasi states
 The Khasis by R.R.T.Gurdon; part 2

History of Meghalaya
History of Assam
Districts of British India
Tourism in Northeast India
1912 establishments in India